The 1900 Utah Agricultural Aggies football team was an American football team that represented Utah Agricultural College (later renamed Utah State University) during the 1900 college football season. In their second season under head coach Willard Langton, the Aggies compiled a 0–2 record.

On November 17, 1900, the team lost to the University of Utah by a 21–0 score at Logan, Utah. The game was the second in what became the Utah–Utah State football rivalry.

Schedule

References

Utah Agricultural
Utah State Aggies football seasons
College football winless seasons
Utah Agricultural Aggies football